The following is a list of unnumbered minor planets in chronological order of their principal provisional designation. Contrary to their numbered counterparts, unnumbered minor planets have a poorly determined orbit due to insufficient observational data. This also includes lost minor planets which have not been observed for many years, or even decades. , the Minor Planet Center (MPC) accounts for 558,491 unnumbered minor planets which represent  of the overall minor planet population. Unnumbered minor planets can be further divided into 111,001 single-opposition objects with short observation arcs, prone to mismatch and loss, and 447,490 objects that have been observed multiple times during opposition, when astrometric conditions are most favorable. The JPL Small-Body Database gives a running total of 561,837 unnumbered minor planets.

The tables below contain 112 objects with a principal designation assigned between 1927 and 1993. Additional partial lists cover the period from 1994 to 2004. Unnumbered minor planets detected after 2004 are not listed due to their large number (see statistics). The orbital uncertainty parameter (U) ranges from low ("0") to very high ("9"). For some single-opposition objects no numeric uncertainty is given ("–" and "E"), latter indicating an estimated, rather than determined orbital eccentricity. Furthermore, a color code is used to indicate a body's basic dynamical classification, with additional information given in columns "class" and "description and notes" (especially for near-Earth objects, Jupiter trojans and distant objects). If available, mean diameters are taken from the latest NEOWISE publication, or, if not available, estimated based on an object's absolute magnitude and displayed in italics. 

In the Minor Planet Circular from July 2018, the MPC announced that changes in their data processing pipeline will enable numberings to occur more frequently. It is stated that the new method will clear the backlog of unnumbered minor planets with an already well-established orbit without changing the criteria for numbering. Previously, this was not possible because of the difficulty of determining who was the discoverer. Despite this announcement, however, the total of unnumbered minor planets has since  rather than decreased.

Statistics

1921–1950 

|- id="1927 LA" bgcolor=#d6d6d6
| – || 1927 LA || MBA-O || 11.0 || 22 km || single || 34 days || 05 Jul 1927 || 3 || align=left | Disc.: Heidelberg Obs.Oldest lost asteroid || 
|- id="1935 UZ" bgcolor=#FA8072
| E || 1935 UZ || MCA || — || — || single || 4 days || 23 Oct 1935 || 3 || align=left | Disc.: Uccle Obs. || 
|- id="1937 CK" bgcolor=#fefefe
| – || 1937 CK || MBA-I || — || — || single || 32 days || 13 Mar 1937 || 3 || align=left | Disc.: Uccle Obs. || 
|- id="1939 RR" bgcolor=#d6d6d6
| – || 1939 RR || MBA-O || 12.0 || 14 km || single || 27 days || 12 Oct 1939 || 3 || align=left | Disc.: Uccle Obs. || 
|- id="1942 RH" bgcolor=#fefefe
| – || 1942 RH || MBA-I || 13.8 || 6.0 km || single || 10 days || 15 Sep 1942 || 3 || align=left | Disc.: Turku Obs. || 
|}
back to top

1951–1980 

|- id="4847 P-L" bgcolor=#fefefe
| 0 || 4847 P-L || MBA-I || 18.04 || data-sort-value="0.26" | 850 m || multiple || 1960-2022 || 25 Jan 2022 || 34 || align=left | Disc.: Palomar–Leiden || 
|- id="6331 P-L" bgcolor=#fefefe
| 1 || 6331 P-L || MBA-I || 18.5 || data-sort-value="0.59" | 590 m || multiple || 1960–2021 || 01 Dec 2021 || 82 || align=left | Disc.: Palomar–Leiden || 
|- id="6344 P-L" bgcolor=#FFC2E0
| 1 || 6344 P-L || APO || 20.4 || data-sort-value="0.30" | 300 m || multiple || 1960–2021 || 04 Aug 2021 || 129 || align=left | Disc.: Palomar–LeidenPotentially hazardous object || 
|- id="1960 SB1" bgcolor=#FA8072
| 1 ||  || MCA || 17.91 || 900 m || multiple || 1960-2022 || 22 Mar 2022 || 56 || align=left | Disc.: Palomar Obs.Alt.: 2017 CT1 || 
|- id="1979 MW5" bgcolor=#d6d6d6
| 0 ||  || MBA-O || 16.49 || 2.9 km || multiple || 1979-2022 || 05 Jun 2022 || 73 || align=left | Disc.: Siding SpringAlt.: 2011 HG10 || 
|- id="1979 XB" bgcolor=#FFC2E0
| 9 || 1979 XB || APO || 18.6 || data-sort-value="0.68" | 680 m || single || 4 days || 15 Dec 1979 || 16 || align=left | Disc.: Siding SpringPotentially hazardous object || 
|}
back to top

1981–1990 

|- id="1981 EN35" bgcolor=#fefefe
| 0 ||  || MBA-I || 17.46 || data-sort-value="0.94" | 940 m || multiple || 1981–2022 || 18 Sep 2022 || 188 || align=left | Disc.: Siding SpringAlt.: 2014 FN21 || 
|- id="1982 YA" bgcolor=#FFC2E0
| 1 || 1982 YA || AMO || 18.1 || data-sort-value="0.85" | 850 m || multiple || 1982–2017 || 03 Dec 2017 || 68 || align=left | Disc.: Haute-ProvenceNEO larger than 1 kilometerAlt.: 2003 WE42 || 
|- id="1983 QC" bgcolor=#FA8072
| 1 || 1983 QC || MCA || 18.1 || data-sort-value="0.71" | 710 m || multiple || 1983–2017 || 24 Dec 2017 || 40 || align=left | Disc.: Palomar Obs. || 
|- id="1984 QL1" bgcolor=#FA8072
| 0 ||  || MCA || 15.6 || 4.2 km || multiple || 1984–2022 || 30 Jan 2022 || 167 || align=left | Disc.: Palomar Obs.MBA-O at JPLAlt.: 2002 XP102, 2013 JS30 || 
|- id="1986 JE" bgcolor=#fefefe
| 0 || 1986 JE || HUN || 18.65 || data-sort-value="0.55" | 550 m || multiple || 1986–2022 || 19 Feb 2022 || 107 || align=left | Disc.: SpacewatchAlt.: 2005 UU548 || 
|- id="1986 NA" bgcolor=#FFC2E0
| 0 || 1986 NA || AMO || 19.85 || data-sort-value="0.38" | 380 m || multiple || 1986–2021 || 31 Oct 2021 || 88 || align=left | Disc.: Palomar Obs.Alt.: 2013 UU3 || 
|- id="1988 NE" bgcolor=#FFC2E0
| 0 || 1988 NE || AMO || 19.25 || data-sort-value="0.54" | 520 m || multiple || 1988–2022 || 17 Sep 2022 || 95 || align=left | Disc.: Palomar Obs. || 
|- id="1988 PF1" bgcolor=#FA8072
| 0 ||  || MCA || 16.7 || 2.5 km || multiple || 1988–2021 || 18 Jan 2021 || 331 || align=left | Disc.: Palomar Obs.Alt.: 2009 WD77 || 
|- id="1988 RH9" bgcolor=#E9E9E9
| – ||  || MBA-M || 11.1 || 21 km || single || 11 days || 12 Sep 1988 || 15 || align=left | Disc.: La Silla Obs. || 
|- id="1989 AZ" bgcolor=#FFC2E0
| 0 || 1989 AZ || APO || 19.72 || data-sort-value="0.43" | 420 m || multiple || 1989–2023 || 16 Feb 2023 || 120 || align=left | Disc.: Palomar Obs. || 
|- id="1989 FR" bgcolor=#d6d6d6
| E || 1989 FR || MBA-O || 13.5 || 6.8 km || single || 2 days || 28 Mar 1989 || 6 || align=left | Disc.: Kleť Obs. || 
|- id="1990 HY6" bgcolor=#d6d6d6
| 2 ||  || MBA-O || 17.68 || 1.6 km || multiple || 1990–2022 || 19 Nov 2022 || 42 || align=left | Disc.: Siding SpringAlt.: 2012 XV90  || 
|- id="1990 SM24" bgcolor=#d6d6d6
| 0 ||  || MBA-O || 16.36 || 3.0 km || multiple || 1990–2023 || 19 Jan 2023 || 246 || align=left | Disc.: La Silla Obs.Alt.: 2008 GU14 || 
|- id="1990 UN" bgcolor=#FFC2E0
| 8 || 1990 UN || APO || 23.5 || data-sort-value="0.071" | 71 m || single || 15 days || 06 Nov 1990 || 22 || align=left | Disc.: Spacewatch || 
|}
back to top

1991 

|- id="1991 BA" bgcolor=#FFC2E0
| 3 || 1991 BA || APO || 28.6 || data-sort-value="0.0068" | 7 m || single || 0 day || 18 Jan 1991 || 7 || align=left | Disc.: Spacewatch || 
|- id="1991 GK" bgcolor=#FA8072
| 0 || 1991 GK || MCA || 19.43 || data-sort-value="0.39" | 390 m || multiple || 1991–2020 || 27 May 2020 || 128 || align=left | Disc.: SpacewatchAlt.: 2020 BE6 || 
|- id="1991 GO" bgcolor=#FFC2E0
| 2 || 1991 GO || APO || 20.0 || data-sort-value="0.36" | 360 m || multiple || 1991–2015 || 03 May 2015 || 79 || align=left | Disc.: Kitami Obs.Potentially hazardous objectAlt.: 1999 HC || 
|- id="1991 JR" bgcolor=#FFC2E0
| 7 || 1991 JR || AMO || 23.4 || data-sort-value="0.074" | 74 m || single || 11 days || 19 May 1991 || 20 || align=left | Disc.: Spacewatch || 
|- id="1991 PN" bgcolor=#d6d6d6
| 0 || 1991 PN || MBA-O || 16.92 || 2.3 km || multiple || 1991–2021 || 09 May 2021 || 48 || align=left | Disc.: Cerro Tololo Obs. || 
|- id="1991 PW22" bgcolor=#E9E9E9
| 0 ||  || MBA-M || 17.45 || 1.0 km || multiple || 1991–2022 || 26 Mar 2022 || 72 || align=left | Disc.: La Silla Obs.Alt.: 2010 CU110 || 
|- id="1991 RN28" bgcolor=#fefefe
| 2 ||  || MBA-I || 19.2 || data-sort-value="0.43" | 430 m || multiple || 1991–2018 || 15 Oct 2018 || 35 || align=left | Disc.: Spacewatch || 
|- id="1991 RY42" bgcolor=#d6d6d6
| 0 ||  || MBA-O || 16.49 || 2.8 km || multiple || 1991–2022 || 25 Oct 2022 || 138 || align=left | Disc.: Spacewatch || 
|- id="1991 SU3" bgcolor=#E9E9E9
| 0 ||  || MBA-M || 17.2 || 1.1 km || multiple || 1991–2022 || 03 May 2022 || 263 || align=left | Disc.: SpacewatchAlt.: 2017 BL95 || 
|- id="1991 TT" bgcolor=#FFC2E0
| 7 || 1991 TT || APO || 26.0 || data-sort-value="0.022" | 22 m || single || 3 days || 09 Oct 1991 || 8 || align=left | Disc.: SpacewatchAMO at MPC || 
|- id="1991 TU" bgcolor=#FFC2E0
| 6 || 1991 TU || APO || 28.4 || data-sort-value="0.0074" | 7 m || single || 0 day || 07 Oct 1991 || 4 || align=left | Disc.: Spacewatch || 
|- id="1991 TT8" bgcolor=#E9E9E9
| 0 ||  || MBA-M || 17.45 || 1.3 km || multiple || 1991–2022 || 07 Sep 2022 || 94 || align=left | Disc.: Spacewatch || 
|- id="1991 TY10" bgcolor=#E9E9E9
| 0 ||  || MBA-M || 17.1 || 1.1 km || multiple || 1991–2021 || 07 Apr 2021 || 128 || align=left | Disc.: SpacewatchAlt.: 2011 PM15 || 
|- id="1991 TK16" bgcolor=#E9E9E9
| 0 ||  || MBA-M || 17.11 || 1.1 km || multiple || 1991–2022 || 28 Mar 2022 || 220 || align=left | Disc.: Palomar–DSSAlt.: 2016 XN4 || 
|- id="1991 TM16" bgcolor=#FA8072
| 0 ||  || MCA || 17.36 || 1.0 km || multiple || 1991–2021 || 07 Feb 2021 || 83 || align=left | Disc.: Palomar–DSSAlt.: 2017 AB3 || 
|- id="1991 TC17" bgcolor=#E9E9E9
| 0 ||  || MBA-M || 17.52 || 1.3 km || multiple || 1991–2022 || 2 Mar 2022 || 169 || align=left | Disc.: Palomar–DSSAlt.: 2016 WD15 || 
|- id="1991 TE17" bgcolor=#fefefe
| 0 ||  || MBA-I || 18.1 || data-sort-value="0.74" | 740 m || multiple || 1991–2022 || 10 Mar 2022 || 139 || align=left | Disc.: Spacewatch || 
|- id="1991 VA" bgcolor=#FFC2E0
| – || 1991 VA || APO || 26.5 || data-sort-value="0.018" | 18 m || single || 8 days || 09 Nov 1991 || 13 || align=left | Disc.: Spacewatch || 
|- id="1991 VD" bgcolor=#FA8072
| E || 1991 VD || HUN || 19.5 || data-sort-value="0.37" | 370 m || single || 2 days || 06 Nov 1991 || 9 || align=left | Disc.: Spacewatch || 
|- id="1991 VG" bgcolor=#FFC2E0
| 0 || 1991 VG || APO || 28.3 || data-sort-value="0.0078" | 8 m || multiple || 1991–2017 || 01 Jun 2017 || 66 || align=left | Disc.: Spacewatch || 
|- id="1991 XA" bgcolor=#FFC2E0
| 8 || 1991 XA || APO || 23.7 || data-sort-value="0.065" | 65 m || single || 12 days || 15 Dec 1991 || 7 || align=left | Disc.: Spacewatch || 
|- id="1991 XB" bgcolor=#FFC2E0
| 1 || 1991 XB || AMO || 18.8 || data-sort-value="0.62" | 620 m || multiple || 1991–2011 || 24 Jul 2011 || 38 || align=left | Disc.: Palomar Obs. || 
|}
back to top

1992 

|- id="1992 DU" bgcolor=#FFC2E0
| 7 || 1992 DU || APO || 25.3 || data-sort-value="0.031" | 31 m || single || 3 days || 29 Feb 1992 || 11 || align=left | Disc.: Spacewatch || 
|- id="1992 JD" bgcolor=#FFC2E0
| 5 || 1992 JD || APO || 25.0 || data-sort-value="0.036" | 36 m || single || 6 days || 09 May 1992 || 23 || align=left | Disc.: SpacewatchAMO at MPC || 
|- id="1992 SW" bgcolor=#FA8072
| 1 || 1992 SW || MCA || 19.9 || data-sort-value="0.31" | 310 m || multiple || 1992–2019 || 09 Apr 2019 || 47 || align=left | Disc.: Spacewatch || 
|- id="1992 SX" bgcolor=#FA8072
| – || 1992 SX || MCA || 20.0 || data-sort-value="0.30" | 300 m || single || 7 days || 04 Oct 1992 || 14 || align=left | Disc.: Spacewatch || 
|- id="1992 SZ" bgcolor=#FFC2E0
| 0 || 1992 SZ || AMO || 20.01 || data-sort-value="0.35" | 350 m || multiple || 1992–2021 || 28 Nov 2021 || 65 || align=left | Disc.: Spacewatch || 
|- id="1992 SM4" bgcolor=#d6d6d6
| 0 ||  || MBA-O || 16.57 || 2.7 km || multiple || 1992–2022 || 24 Oct 2022 || 94 || align=left | Disc.: SpacewatchAlt.: 2010 EH143, 2015 DM47 || 
|- id="1992 SN4" bgcolor=#E9E9E9
| 0 ||  || MBA-M || 18.55 || data-sort-value="0.58" | 580 m || multiple || 1992–2022 || 27 Jan 2022 || 65 || align=left | Disc.: Spacewatch || 
|- id="1992 SC8" bgcolor=#E9E9E9
| 0 ||  || MBA-M || 18.38 || data-sort-value="0.63" | 630 m || multiple || 1992–2021 || 30 Nov 2021 || 82 || align=left | Disc.: SpacewatchAlt.: 2017 WV33  || 
|- id="1992 SW11" bgcolor=#fefefe
| 2 ||  || MBA-I || 17.3 || 1.0 km || multiple || 1992–2020 || 25 Dec 2020 || 20 || align=left | Disc.: Spacewatch || 
|- id="1992 SB12" bgcolor=#fefefe
| 2 ||  || MBA-I || 18.9 || data-sort-value="0.49" | 490 m || multiple || 1992–2022 || 7 Jan 2022 || 29 || align=left | Disc.: SpacewatchAlt.: 2017 SW186 || 
|- id="1992 SZ17" bgcolor=#E9E9E9
| E ||  || MBA-M || 13.8 || 2.0 km || single || 4 days || 03 Oct 1992 || 6 || align=left | Disc.: Palomar Obs. || 
|- id="1992 SS27" bgcolor=#E9E9E9
| 0 ||  || MBA-M || 17.30 || 1.0 km || multiple || 1992–2021 || 06 Nov 2021 || 168 || align=left | Disc.: Spacewatch || 
|- id="1992 TY1" bgcolor=#d6d6d6
| E ||  || MBA-O || 12.8 || 9.5 km || single || 3 days || 05 Oct 1992 || 5 || align=left | Disc.: Kitt Peak Obs. || 
|- id="1992 TZ1" bgcolor=#fefefe
| – ||  || MBA-I || 15.5 || 2.4 km || single || 4 days || 05 Oct 1992 || 5 || align=left | Disc.: Kitt Peak Obs. || 
|- id="1992 TJ2" bgcolor=#d6d6d6
| 0 ||  || MBA-O || 16.38 || 2.9 km || multiple || 1992–2021 || 27 Oct 2021 || 133 || align=left | Disc.: Spacewatch || 
|- id="1992 WP10" bgcolor=#d6d6d6
| 0 ||  || MBA-O || 16.16 || 3.3 km || multiple || 1992–2021 || 02 Jan 2021 || 146 || align=left | Disc.: Spacewatch || 
|- id="1992 WQ10" bgcolor=#E9E9E9
| 0 ||  || MBA-M || 17.94 || data-sort-value="0.77" | 770 m || multiple || 1992–2021 || 27 Oct 2021 || 156 || align=left | Disc.: Spacewatch || 
|- id="1992 XA" bgcolor=#d6d6d6
| 1 || 1992 XA || MBA-O || 17.5 || 1.8 km || multiple || 1992–2018 || 13 Dec 2018 || 156 || align=left | Disc.: SpacewatchAlt.: 2005 UG242 || 
|- id="1992 YD3" bgcolor=#FFC2E0
| 4 ||  || APO || 26.4 || data-sort-value="0.019" | 19 m || single || 0 day || 27 Dec 1992 || 12 || align=left | Disc.: SpacewatchAMO at MPC || 
|}
back to top

1993 

|- id="1993 BD3" bgcolor=#FFC2E0
| 7 ||  || AMO || 26.2 || data-sort-value="0.020" | 20 m || single || 5 days || 31 Jan 1993 || 14 || align=left | Disc.: Spacewatch || 
|- id="1993 BU3" bgcolor=#FFC2E0
| 5 ||  || AMO || 21.5 || data-sort-value="0.18" | 180 m || single || 33 days || 03 Mar 1993 || 18 || align=left | Disc.: Spacewatch || 
|- id="1993 BZ9" bgcolor=#E9E9E9
| 0 ||  || MBA-M || 17.52 || 1.3 km || multiple || 1993–2021 || 03 Oct 2021 || 144 || align=left | Disc.: SpacewatchAlt.: 2011 FR39, 2015 BQ428 || 
|- id="1993 BC10" bgcolor=#E9E9E9
| 1 ||  || MBA-M || 18.59 || data-sort-value="0.57" | 570 m || multiple || 1993–2020 || 16 Sep 2020 || 50 || align=left | Disc.: Spacewatch|| 
|- id="1993 BK10" bgcolor=#fefefe
| 0 ||  || MBA-I || 18.61 || data-sort-value="0.56" | 560 m || multiple || 1993–2021 || 04 Jan 2021 || 55 || align=left | Disc.: SpacewatchAlt.: 2006 XR55 || 
|- id="1993 BF12" bgcolor=#fefefe
| 0 ||  || MBA-I || 18.65 || data-sort-value="0.55" | 550 m || multiple || 1993–2022 || 06 Jan 2022 || 136 || align=left | Disc.: SpacewatchAlt.: 2005 YY252 || 
|- id="1993 BC16" bgcolor=#C2FFFF
| 0 ||  || JT || 13.09 || 13 km || multiple || 1990–2021 || 26 Aug 2021 || 247 || align=left | Disc.: SpacewatchTrojan camp (L5) || 
|- id="1993 BD16" bgcolor=#C2FFFF
| 0 ||  || JT || 14.28 || 7.8 km || multiple || 1993–2021 || 11 May 2021 || 179 || align=left | Disc.: SpacewatchTrojan camp (L5) || 
|- id="1993 DA" bgcolor=#FFC2E0
| 6 || 1993 DA || ATE || 26.4 || data-sort-value="0.019" | 19 m || single || 5 days || 22 Feb 1993 || 18 || align=left | Disc.: Spacewatch || 
|- id="1993 FA1" bgcolor=#FFC2E0
| 7 ||  || APO || 25.9 || data-sort-value="0.023" | 23 m || single || 3 days || 31 Mar 1993 || 17 || align=left | Disc.: SpacewatchAMO at MPC || 
|- id="1993 FB85" bgcolor=#E9E9E9
| 0 ||  || MBA-M || 17.3 || 1.9 km || multiple || 1993–2022 || 29 Oct 2022 || 64 || align=left | Disc.: SpacewatchAlt.: 2002 GO188 || 
|- id="1993 FE85" bgcolor=#E9E9E9
| 0 ||  || MBA-M || 17.78 || 1.5 km || multiple || 1993–2022 || 08 Nov 2022 || 87 || align=left | Disc.: Spacewatch || 
|- id="1993 HC" bgcolor=#FFC2E0
| 0 || 1993 HC || APO || 20.77 || data-sort-value="0.25" | 250 m || multiple || 1993–2021 || 07 May 2021 || 54 || align=left | Disc.: Spacewatch || 
|- id="1993 HP1" bgcolor=#FFC2E0
| 3 ||  || APO || 27.1 || data-sort-value="0.014" | 14 m || single || 0 day || 27 Apr 1993 || 27 || align=left | Disc.: Spacewatch || 
|- id="1993 HF2" bgcolor=#E9E9E9
| 0 ||  || MBA-M || 17.80 || 1.2 km || multiple || 1993–2020 || 26 Sep 2020 || 70 || align=left | Disc.: Spacewatch || 
|- id="1993 KA" bgcolor=#FFC2E0
| – || 1993 KA || APO || 26.0 || data-sort-value="0.022" | 22 m || single || 9 days || 26 May 1993 || 21 || align=left | Disc.: SpacewatchAMO at MPC || 
|- id="1993 KA2" bgcolor=#FFC2E0
| – ||  || APO || 29.0 || data-sort-value="0.0056" | 6 m || single || 1 day || 22 May 1993 || 10 || align=left | Disc.: Spacewatch || 
|- id="1993 ME1" bgcolor=#FA8072
| 1 ||  || MCA || 16.8 || 1.8 km || multiple || 1993–2020 || 10 Dec 2020 || 136 || align=left | Disc.: Palomar Obs. || 
|- id="1993 OT" bgcolor=#FA8072
| – || 1993 OT || MCA || 19.0 || data-sort-value="0.47" | 470 m || single || 20 days || 13 Aug 1993 || 9 || align=left | Disc.: Spacewatch || 
|- id="1993 OM1" bgcolor=#E9E9E9
| 0 ||  || MBA-M || 17.5 || 1.3 km || multiple || 1993–2022 || 27 Jan 2022 || 51 || align=left | Disc.: SpacewatchAlt.: 2015 MT193 || 
|- id="1993 OW5" bgcolor=#E9E9E9
| 0 ||  || MBA-M || 17.34 || 1.1 km || multiple || 1993–2022 || 28 Oct 2022 || 247 || align=left | Disc.: La Silla Obs. || 
|- id="1993 OP9" bgcolor=#fefefe
| 0 ||  || MBA-I || 17.80 || data-sort-value="0.82" | 820 m || multiple || 1993–2021 || 28 Jul 2021 || 113 || align=left | Disc.: La Silla Obs.Alt.: 2004 TH237 || 
|- id="1993 PA1" bgcolor=#fefefe
| 0 ||  || MBA-I || 18.71 || data-sort-value="0.54" | 540 m || multiple || 1993–2022 || 28 Oct 2022 || 45 || align=left | Disc.: SpacewatchAlt.: 2009 QA32 || 
|- id="1993 PK1" bgcolor=#fefefe
| 0 ||  || MBA-I || 18.84 || data-sort-value="0.57" | 570 m || multiple || 1993–2022 || 04 Apr 2022 || 51 || align=left | Disc.: Spacewatch || 
|- id="1993 RP" bgcolor=#C2E0FF
| E || 1993 RP || TNO || 9.0 || 75 km || single || 2 days || 17 Sep 1993 || 6 || align=left | Disc.: Mauna Kea Obs.LoUTNOs, plutino? || 
|- id="1993 SZ16" bgcolor=#d6d6d6
| 0 ||  || MBA-O || 16.49 || 3.1 km || multiple || 1993–2022 || 02 Nov 2022 || 146 || align=left | Disc.: Spacewatch || 
|- id="1993 TZ" bgcolor=#FFC2E0
| 1 || 1993 TZ || APO || 26.0 || data-sort-value="0.022" | 22 m || multiple || 1993–2016 || 14 Oct 2016 || 34 || align=left | Disc.: Spacewatch || 
|- id="1993 TR2" bgcolor=#FA8072
| – ||  || MCA || 20.4 || data-sort-value="0.35" | 350 m || single || 12 days || 24 Oct 1993 || 15 || align=left | Disc.: Spacewatch || 
|- id="1993 TK4" bgcolor=#E9E9E9
| 2 ||  || MBA-M || 18.7 || data-sort-value="0.76" | 760 m || multiple || 1993–2020 || 19 Jan 2020 || 42 || align=left | Disc.: SpacewatchAlt.: 2019 SY43 || 
|- id="1993 TQ4" bgcolor=#fefefe
| 2 ||  || MBA-I || 17.9 || data-sort-value="0.78" | 780 m || multiple || 1993–2020 || 15 May 2020 || 39 || align=left | Disc.: Spacewatch || 
|- id="1993 TP6" bgcolor=#E9E9E9
| 0 ||  || MBA-I || 19.26 || data-sort-value="0.48" | 480 m || multiple || 1993–2022 || 27 Oct 2022 || 68 || align=left | Disc.: Spacewatch || 
|- id="1993 TL8" bgcolor=#fefefe
| 0 ||  || MBA-M || 17.37 || 1.4 km || multiple || 1993–2021 || 7 Nov 2021 || 86 || align=left | Disc.: SpacewatchAlt.: 2012 UH179  || 
|- id="1993 TC11" bgcolor=#E9E9E9
| 0 ||  || MBA-M || 19.51 || data-sort-value="0.41" | 410 m || multiple || 1993–2022 || 29 Oct 2022 || 78 || align=left | Disc.: Spacewatch || 
|- id="1993 UA" bgcolor=#FFC2E0
| 6 || 1993 UA || APO || 25.4 || data-sort-value="0.030" | 30 m || single || 3 days || 24 Oct 1993 || 15 || align=left | Disc.: Spacewatch || 
|- id="1993 UD" bgcolor=#FFC2E0
| 0 || 1993 UD || AMO || 20.38 || data-sort-value="0.36" | 360 m || multiple || 1993–2022 || 15 Dec 2022 || 68 || align=left | Disc.: Spacewatch || 
|- id="1993 UY7" bgcolor=#FA8072
| 0 || 1993 UY7 || MCA || 18.75 || data-sort-value="0.53" | 530 m || multiple || 1993-2022 || 23 Oct 2022 || 52 || align=left | Disc.: SpacewatchAlt.: 2015 XV465 || 
|- id="1993 UH10" bgcolor=#E9E9E9
| 0 ||  || MBA-M || 17.27 || 2.0 km || multiple || 1993–2021 || 30 Nov 2021 || 138 || align=left | Disc.: Spacewatch || 
|- id="1993 UJ10" bgcolor=#E9E9E9
| 0 ||  || MBA-M || 17.9 || 1.1 km || multiple || 1993–2021 || 9 Dec 2021 || 98 || align=left | Disc.: SpacewatchAlt.: 2007 VJ50  || 
|- id="1993 VC" bgcolor=#FA8072
| 1 || 1993 VC || MCA || 20.5 || data-sort-value="0.44" | 440 m || multiple || 1993–2007 || 11 Nov 2007 || 34 || align=left | Disc.: Spacewatch || 
|- id="1993 VD6" bgcolor=#fefefe
| 0 ||  || MBA-I || 18.53 || data-sort-value="0.60" | 600 m || multiple || 1993–2022 || 01 Jun 2022 || 99 || align=left | Disc.: Spacewatch || 
|- id="1993 VE6" bgcolor=#fefefe
| 0 ||  || MBA-I || 19.16 || data-sort-value="0.43" | 430 m || multiple || 1993–2022 || 07 Apr 2022 || 49 || align=left | Disc.: SpacewatchAlt.: 2003 SE413 || 
|- id="1993 VG6" bgcolor=#d6d6d6
| 0 ||  || MBA-O || 16.86 || 2.4 km || multiple || 1993–2022 || 10 Mar 2022 || 98 || align=left | Disc.: Spacewatch || 
|- id="1993 VQ6" bgcolor=#d6d6d6
| 0 ||  || MBA-O || 17.00 || 2.2 km || multiple || 1993–2021 || 08 Dec 2021 || 67 || align=left | Disc.: SpacewatchAlt.: 2015 RE311 || 
|- id="1993 VT6" bgcolor=#E9E9E9
| 0 ||  || MBA-M || 17.12 || 1.2 km || multiple || 1993-2022 || 06 Nov 2022 || 70 || align=left | Disc.: Spacewatch || 
|- id="1993 VV6" bgcolor=#fefefe
| 0 ||  || MBA-I || 18.08 || data-sort-value="0.72" | 720 m || multiple || 1993–2022 || 26 Oct 2022 || 106 || align=left | Disc.: SpacewatchAlt.: 2010 AL150, 2010 NN39 || 
|- id="1993 XN3" bgcolor=#fefefe
| 0 ||  || MBA-I || 18.09 || data-sort-value="0.72" | 720 m || multiple || 1993–2022 || 02 Oct 2022 || 121 || align=left | Disc.: Spacewatch || 
|}
back to top

1994–2004 

 List of unnumbered minor planets: 1994
 List of unnumbered minor planets: 1995
 List of unnumbered minor planets: 1996
 List of unnumbered minor planets: 1997
 List of unnumbered minor planets: 1998
 List of unnumbered minor planets: 1999 A–R
 List of unnumbered minor planets: 1999 S–T
 List of unnumbered minor planets: 1999 U–Y
 List of unnumbered minor planets: 2000 A–E
 List of unnumbered minor planets: 2000 F–O
 List of unnumbered minor planets: 2000 P–R
 List of unnumbered minor planets: 2000 S–T
 List of unnumbered minor planets: 2000 U–Y

 2001

 List of unnumbered minor planets: 2001 A–E
 List of unnumbered minor planets: 2001 F (0–216)
 List of unnumbered minor planets: 2001 F (217–619)
 List of unnumbered minor planets: 2001 G–O
 List of unnumbered minor planets: 2001 P–R
 List of unnumbered minor planets: 2001 S
 List of unnumbered minor planets: 2001 T
 List of unnumbered minor planets: 2001 U
 List of unnumbered minor planets: 2001 V–W
 List of unnumbered minor planets: 2001 X–Y

 2002

 List of unnumbered minor planets: 2002 A–B
 List of unnumbered minor planets: 2002 C
 List of unnumbered minor planets: 2002 D–F
 List of unnumbered minor planets: 2002 G–K
 List of unnumbered minor planets: 2002 L–O
 List of unnumbered minor planets: 2002 P
 List of unnumbered minor planets: 2002 Q (0–119)
 List of unnumbered minor planets: 2002 Q (120–619)
 List of unnumbered minor planets: 2002 R (0–262)
 List of unnumbered minor planets: 2002 R (263–619)
 List of unnumbered minor planets: 2002 S
 List of unnumbered minor planets: 2002 T (0–319)
 List of unnumbered minor planets: 2002 T (320–619)
 List of unnumbered minor planets: 2002 U–V
 List of unnumbered minor planets: 2002 W–Y

 2003

 List of unnumbered minor planets: 2003 A–E
 List of unnumbered minor planets: 2003 F–G
 List of unnumbered minor planets: 2003 H–L
 List of unnumbered minor planets: 2003 M–R
 List of unnumbered minor planets: 2003 S (0–269)
 List of unnumbered minor planets: 2003 S (270–389)
 List of unnumbered minor planets: 2003 S (390–442)
 List of unnumbered minor planets: 2003 S (443–619)
 List of unnumbered minor planets: 2003 T
 List of unnumbered minor planets: 2003 U (0–289)
 List of unnumbered minor planets: 2003 U (290–379)
 List of unnumbered minor planets: 2003 U (380–429)
 List of unnumbered minor planets: 2003 U (430–619)
 List of unnumbered minor planets: 2003 V
 List of unnumbered minor planets: 2003 W (0–199)
 List of unnumbered minor planets: 2003 W (200–619)
 List of unnumbered minor planets: 2003 X–Y

 2004

 List of unnumbered minor planets: 2004 A–B
 List of unnumbered minor planets: 2004 C
 List of unnumbered minor planets: 2004 D–E
 List of unnumbered minor planets: 2004 F
 List of unnumbered minor planets: 2004 G–H
 List of unnumbered minor planets: 2004 J–O
 List of unnumbered minor planets: 2004 P–Q
 List of unnumbered minor planets: 2004 R (0–199)
 List of unnumbered minor planets: 2004 R (200–299)
 List of unnumbered minor planets: 2004 R (300–619)
 List of unnumbered minor planets: 2004 S
 List of unnumbered minor planets: 2004 T (0–99)
 List of unnumbered minor planets: 2004 T (100–199)
 List of unnumbered minor planets: 2004 T (200–299)
 List of unnumbered minor planets: 2004 T (300–619)
 List of unnumbered minor planets: 2004 U–V
 List of unnumbered minor planets: 2004 W–X
 List of unnumbered minor planets: 2004 Y

2005–present 

The year of principal provisional designation for most unnumbered minor planets is younger than 2004 (see ). They are not listed in any of the partial lists due to their large number and frequent changes. New partial lists may be created in the future, as additional observations ultimately lead to new numberings and to fewer unnumbered bodies.

See also 
 Lists of astronomical objects
 List of unnumbered trans-Neptunian objects

Notes

References 
 

 

unnumbered